Mark Lawrence (born 1966) is an American-British novelist who wrote The Broken Empire trilogy. In 2014, Lawrence won the David Gemmell Legend Award for best novel for Emperor of Thorns. He operates the annual Self-Published Fantasy Blog-Off.

Biography
Mark Lawrence was born in 1966, in the United States. While he was still young, his parents moved to the United Kingdom.

Lawrence has a degree in physics and holds a PhD in mathematics.

He is married and has four children. Lawrence is the primary carer of his disabled child Celyn, and for this reason he does not travel to promote his books or attend conventions. He works as a novelist and was a research scientist in the field of artificial intelligence. He has held secret level clearance with both US and UK governments.

Since 2015, Lawrence has operated the annual Self-Published Fantasy Blog-Off, a literary contest intended to bring greater visibility to self-published English-language fantasy authors.

In 2021 Lawrence was nominated (and shortlisted) for the Nobel Peace prize as a contributor to a North Carolina committee on justice reform.

Reception
Lawrence's first work, Prince of Thorns, was a finalist in the Goodreads Choice Award for "Best Fantasy 2011", a David Gemmell Morningstar Award Finalist in 2012 and short listed for the Prix Imaginales (Roman étranger) in 2013. Prince of Thorns was also one of Barnes & Noble's "Best Fantasy Releases of 2011".

His second book, King of Thorns was again a finalist in the Goodreads Choice Award for "Best Fantasy 2012." King of Thorns was also one of Barnes & Noble's "Best Fantasy Releases of 2012", and a David Gemmell Legend Award Finalist in 2013.

The final book in the Broken Empire trilogy, Emperor of Thorns, was published in August 2013 and was on the Sunday Times Bestseller list. It also made the final of the Goodreads Choice Award (2013) and won the David Gemmell Legend Award (2014).

His second trilogy, The Red Queen's War, is set in the same world as the Broken Empire trilogy. Prince of Fools was a semi-finalist in the Goodreads Choice Award for "Best Fantasy 2014" in an expanded category. It was also a David Gemmell Legend Award Finalist in 2015. The Liar's Key was a semi-finalist in the Goodreads Choice Award for "Best Fantasy 2015", and won Lawrence a second David Gemmell Legend Award (2016). The Wheel of Osheim was a semi-finalist in the Goodreads Choice Award for "Best Fantasy 2016".

In April 2015, Harper Voyager acquired the rights for his next fantasy trilogy - The Red Sister Trilogy for a six-figure sum from Ian Drury at Sheil Land. This trilogy is not set in the world of the Broken Empire.

His work is translated into 25 languages and he has sold around two million books worldwide.

Bibliography

The Broken Empire
 Prince of Thorns (August 2011)
 King of Thorns (August 2012)
 Emperor of Thorns (August 2013)

A short story entitled Sleeping Beauty set in the Broken Empire was released in April 2014.

The Red Queen's War
 Prince of Fools (June 2014)
 The Liar's Key (June 2015)
 The Wheel of Osheim (June 2016)

The Book of the Ancestor
 Red Sister (April 2017)
 Grey Sister (April 2018)
 Holy Sister (April 2019)

Impossible Times
 One Word Kill (May 2019)
 Limited Wish (June 2019)
 Dispel Illusion (November 2019)

The Book of the Ice
 The Girl and the Stars (April 2020)
 The Girl and the Mountain (April 2021)
 The Girl and the Moon (April 2022)

The Book That Wouldn't Burn
 The Book That Wouldn't Burn (May 2023)

Short and standalone works
 Dark Tide (2012) released in Fading Light Anthology
 Quick (2013) released in Triumph Over Tragedy Anthology
 Select Mode (2013) released in Unfettered
 Bad Seed (2014) released in Grimdark Magazine issue No. 1
 During the Dance (2014) A free standalone short story that is available on his Website
 A Rescue (2015)- Available in Legends II: Stories in Honour of David Gemmell
 The Dream-Taker's Apprentice (2015) First published in Fantasy Faction's 2015 anthology and one of three winners to be included in the Remastered Words 2017 audio anthology, eventually titled "Fabled Journey II"
 Christmas Tale - A free standalone short story that is available on his Website
 Locked In - A free standalone short story that is available on his Website
 No Second Troy - A short story that is available in the Broken Empire Omnibus
 Road Brothers - A short story collection that has 10 stories all set in The Broken Empire world.
 Gunlaw (2015) A Standalone book that is serially released on Wattpad
 Blood of the Red - A standalone books that is serially released on Wattpad
 The Hero of Aral Pass (2017) released in Art of War: Anthology for Charity

Poetry
Free poems available on his website:
 Sea Song
 Stumble
 Blue
 Shouting for the Echo
 High, Cold, Silent, Alone

References

External links
 Mark Lawrence Homepage
 Personal Blog
 Mark Lawrence Goodreads Page
 The Unofficial Website of Mark Lawrence
 Interview with Isaac Hooke
 Interview with Shadowlocked
 Grimdark Magazine interviews Mark Lawrence

1966 births
Living people
21st-century American novelists
21st-century British novelists
American fantasy writers
American male novelists
British fantasy writers
British male writers
21st-century American male writers